OpenWeb is a social engagement platform that builds online communities around digital content. OpenWeb works with publishers to bring conversations back from social networks to publisher sites.

Headquartered in New York City, the company also has offices in Tel Aviv, Israel, San Diego, CA, Paris, France, London, UK, and London, Ontario, Canada.

OpenWeb's technology allows publishers and online content creators to host and moderate comments sections, Polls, "Ask Me Anything`s, and Live Blogs. Their products also include a module that allows users to track topics, an insights dashboard, and several advertising modules.

History

The company was founded in 2015 as Spot.IM by Israeli software architects Nadav Shoval and Ishay Green. Roee Goldberg joined as Co-Founder and COO in 2014. 

In 2016, Spot.IM raised $13 million from Index Ventures and AltaIR Capital, along with other notable technology investors, in a Series A round.

In 2017, co-founder and CEO, Nadav Shoval, was inducted into the second annual Forbes Israel 30 Under 30 list. In addition, the company finalized its Series C investment round of $25M, led by New York City-based fund - Insight Partners, Altair VC, and more.

In 2019, Spot.IM raised $25 million in Series D funding. The new funding was led by previous investor Insight Partners along with Norma Investments, AltaIR Capital, Cerca and WGI Group. 

In 2020, the company was renamed OpenWeb.

In November 2021, OpenWeb raised a $150M Series E financing round which included investment from Insight Partners, Georgian, The New York Times Company, Samsung Next, Dentsu Ventures, Harel, Entrée Capital, Omer Cygler, and Scott Galloway. This round of investment pushed the company's valuation over $1 billion. In November 2022, OpenWeb announced a Series F round of funding at $170M, valuing the company at over $1.5 billion.

In February 2022, the company acquired Hive Media Group for a mix of cash and stock, with a total value of $60M.  In April 2022, OpenWeb acquired French advertising company Adyoulike for a mix of cash and stock, with a total value of $100M. In January 2023, OpenWeb acquired personalization and monetization platform Jeeng.

See also
 Internet forum
 List of social networking websites
 Online community
 Social networking service
 Website monetization

References

External links
 

Companies based in Tel Aviv
Internet properties established in 2015
Online companies of Israel

he:אופן ווב טכנולוגיות